Deliu is a surname. Notable people with the surname include:

Arbër Deliu (born 2000), Albanian footballer
Ardit Deliu (born 1997), Albanian footballer
Tudor Deliu (born 1955), Moldovan philologist and politician

See also
Delius